The British Packet, and Argentine News was an Anglo-Argentine weekly newspaper, edited for the British and American community of Buenos Aires. The journal was founded by Thomas George Love in 1826, and published until 1859.

History 

His first print was published on Friday, 4 August 1826, and among other notices reference was made to the conflict between Argentina and Brazil (Cisplatine War). Edited mainly for the British community, it had among its readers members of the American and German community, including Irish Catholics, and their descendants, established in Buenos Aires since the 18th century.

The British Packet, and Argentine News was the main English-speaking newspaper of the Río de la Plata. During the second English invasion, was edited The Southern Star, a bilingual newspaper published in Montevideo.

Another important English-speaking newspaper was The Cosmopolitan, whose first print run was published on Wednesday, 23 November 1831.

Gallery

References

External links 
catalogo.bn.gov.ar

Defunct newspapers published in Argentina
Newspapers established in 1826
Publications disestablished in 1859
Río de la Plata
Weekly newspapers published in Argentina
1826 establishments in Argentina
1859 disestablishments in Argentina